Carlos Miguel Tavares de Oliveira (born 9 March 1993), known as Carlitos, is a Portuguese professional footballer who plays as a right winger for Greek club Aiolikos.

Club career

Doxa
Born in Almada, Setúbal District, Carlitos started his senior career in 2012 with amateurs S.U. Sintrense. In the following year, aged 20, he signed for Doxa Katokopias FC of the Cypriot First Division.

Carlitos made his debut as a professional on 1 September 2013, coming in as a second-half substitute in a 2–0 home win against Nea Salamis Famagusta FC. On 26 January of the following year he scored his first goal for the club, in a 2–1 loss at Apollon Limassol FC.

In summer 2014, Carlitos joined fellow Cypriot top-flight team AEL Limassol on a season-long loan deal. He subsequently returned to Doxa.

APOEL and Anorthosis
On 9 June 2016, Carlitos moved to reigning Cypriot champions APOEL FC on a three-year contract, but two months later he was sold to Anorthosis Famagusta F.C. for a reported fee of €100,000.

Later career
In the following years, Carlitos represented Wisła Płock (Polish Ekstraklasa), FC Kaisar (Kazakhstan Premier League), Doxa Katokopias FC (Cypriot top tier) and FC Pyunik (Armenian Premier League).

Honours
Kaisar
Kazakhstan Cup: 2019

Pyunik
Armenian Premier League: 2021–22

References

External links

1993 births
Living people
Sportspeople from Almada
Black Portuguese sportspeople
Portuguese footballers
Association football wingers
G.D. Estoril Praia players
S.U. Sintrense players
Cypriot First Division players
Doxa Katokopias FC players
AEL Limassol players
APOEL FC players
Anorthosis Famagusta F.C. players
Ekstraklasa players
Wisła Płock players
Kazakhstan Premier League players
FC Kaisar players
Armenian Premier League players
FC Pyunik players
Super League Greece 2 players
Portuguese expatriate footballers
Expatriate footballers in Cyprus
Expatriate footballers in Poland
Expatriate footballers in Kazakhstan
Expatriate footballers in Armenia
Expatriate footballers in Greece
Portuguese expatriate sportspeople in Cyprus
Portuguese expatriate sportspeople in Poland
Portuguese expatriate sportspeople in Kazakhstan
Portuguese expatriate sportspeople in Armenia
Portuguese expatriate sportspeople in Greece